The eightieth Minnesota Legislature first convened on January 7, 1997. The 67 members of the Minnesota Senate and the 134 members of the Minnesota House of Representatives were elected during the General Election of November 5, 1996.

Sessions 
The legislature met in a regular session from January 7, 1997, to May 15, 1997. A special session convened on June 26, 1997, to consider funding for K–12 schools, DWI measures, and government data practices. A second special session was convened on August 19, 1997, to provide flood relief and consider commissioners' pay and the minimum wage. A third special session was held from October 23, 1997, to November 14, 1997, to consider providing funding for a baseball stadium.

A continuation of the regular session was held between January 20, 1998, and April 9, 1998. An additional special session met from April 20, 1998, to April 22, 1998, to clarify legislation to allow for fraud recovery, and consider economic development issues and issues relevant to early childhood and family education.

Party summary 
Resignations and new members are discussed in the "Membership changes" section, below.

Senate

House of Representatives

Leadership

Senate 
President of the Senate
Allan Spear (DFL-Minneapolis)

Senate Majority Leader
Roger Moe (DFL-Erskine)

Senate Minority Leader
Until July 9, 1997 Dean Johnson (R-Willmar)
After July 9, 1997 Dick Day (R-Owatonna)

House of Representatives 
Speaker of the House
Phil Carruthers (DFL-Brooklyn Center)

House Majority Leader
Ted Winter (DFL-Fulda)

House Minority Leader
Steve Sviggum (R-Kenyon)

Members

Senate

House of Representatives

Membership changes

House of Representatives

References 

 Minnesota Legislators Past & Present - Session Search Results (Session 80, Senate)
 Minnesota Legislators Past & Present - Session Search Results (Session 80, House)

80th
1990s in Minnesota
1997 in Minnesota
1998 in Minnesota
1997 U.S. legislative sessions
1998 U.S. legislative sessions